D.A.V. P.G. College, Lucknow is a Government-aided degree college affiliated to the University of Lucknow. The college has its origin in a school started in the premises of Arya Samaj temple in Ganeshganj locality in 1918. In 1926, the school shifted to the present premises, and graduate classes were started in 1956.

Spread over 25 acres, the main campus is situated in Arya Nagar, near Naka Hindola, 1 km from Charbagh Railway Station. It offers graduate courses in Arts, Law and Science stream. It also offers Master courses for Arts and Law streams. It has two campuses, one for Law and another for Arts And Science. In 2012, India Today placed the college amongst top 5 "Best Science Colleges in Lucknow".

See also

 Arya Samaj

References

External links
 

Law schools in Uttar Pradesh
Universities and colleges in Lucknow
University of Lucknow
Universities and colleges affiliated with the Arya Samaj
Educational institutions established in 1956
1956 establishments in Uttar Pradesh